Witos is a Polish surname. Notable people with the surname include:

 Andrzej Witos (1878–1973), Polish politician and activist, brother of Wincenty
 Wincenty Witos (1874–1945), Polish politician

See also
 

Polish-language surnames